Toktogul Secondary School can refer to: 
 Toktogul Secondary School (Isfana) - a high school in Isfana
 There are many schools that bear Toktogul's name; please expand the list